Gobichettipalayam is an industrial and agricultural area, and is an educational hub. It sends the second highest number of students to professional courses in Tamil Nadu each year.

Institutes of engineering and technology
 Shree Venkateshwara Hi-Tech Engineering College, Othakuthirai
 J.K.K. Munirajah college of Technology, T.N.Palayam
 Bannari Amman Institute of Technology, Sathy

Arts and science colleges
 Gobi Arts and Science College, Karatadipalayam
 P.K.R. Arts College for Women, Murugan Pudur
 Saratha College Of Arts And Science, Gobichettipalayam
 Govt Arts And Science College, Thittamalai, Nambiyur

Business schools
 P.K.R. School of Management for Women, Muruganpudur
 Gem Business Academy, Kolappalur

Others
 Sudar College of Paramedical Science, Kolappalur
 Anndavar Polytechnic College, Kovai Privu
 Andavar Industrial Training Institute, Gobichettipalayam
 Shree Venkateshwara Hi-Tech Polytechnic College, Othakuthirai
 Government ITI, Dasappagounden Pudur

Schools
 Diamond Jubilee Matriculation School, Ram Nagar, Gobi
 Sri Venkateshwara vidyalaya Matric and Higher Secondary School, Thasampalam, Gobi
 Diamond Jubilee Higher Secondary School, Cutchery Street
 Palaniammal Girls Higher Secondary School, Gobichettipalayam
 C.K.K. Matriculation Higher Secondary School, Gobichettipalayam
 Shree Vidyalaya|Shree Vidyalaya Matriculation Higher Secondary School, Vaikkal Road
 Saratha Matriculation and Higher Secondary School, Modachur
 Amala matriculation and Higher secondary school, Gobichettipalayam
 Bharathi Vidyalaya school, Gobichettipalayam
 Kamban Kalvi Nilayam Matric Higher Sec School, Gobichettipalayam
 Shree Gurukulam Higher Secondary School, Gobichettipalayam
 St. Paul's Matriculation and Higher Secondary School, Gobichettipalayam

See also
 List of Educational Institutions in Erode
 List of schools in Coimbatore

References

Gobichettipalayam
Education in Gobichettipalayam